The 1999–2000 season was the 90th season of competitive football in Germany.

National teams

Germany national football team

UEFA Euro 2000 qualification

UEFA Euro 2000

1999 FIFA Confederations Cup

Friendly matches

Germany women's national football team

UEFA Women's Euro 2001 qualification

Friendly matches

League season

Men

Bundesliga

2. Bundesliga

Women

Bundesliga

References

 
Seasons in German football